Windy Gap is a pass 975 m high, located at the northeast end of Louis Philippe Plateau. It marks the meeting place of three valleys of Trinity Peninsula, namely Broad Valley leading eastward toward Duse Bay, that of Sestrimo Glacier leading northward to Lafond Bay, and another southward to Prince Gustav Channel. Discovered by the Falkland Islands Dependencies Survey (FIDS) and so named because of the very bad weather experienced in the pass during a survey journey in April 1946.

Map
 Trinity Peninsula. Scale 1:250000 topographic map No. 5697. Institut für Angewandte Geodäsie and British Antarctic Survey, 1996.

Mountain passes of Trinity Peninsula